Zagrad is a dispersed settlement in the hills south of Prevalje in the Carinthia region in northern Slovenia.

References

External links
Zagrad on Geopedia

Populated places in the Municipality of Prevalje